Middle Shabelle is an administrative region (gobol) in southern Somalia.

Overview
It is bordered by the Somali regions of Galguduud, Hiran, Lower Shabelle (Shabellaha Hoose), and Banaadir, as well as the Somali Sea.

As part of the former Benadir region, Middle Shabelle's capital was Mogadishu up until the mid-1980s, when the town of Jowhar became the capital. It is named after the Shebelle River that passes through this region.

Middle Shabelle is principally inhabited by Abgaal.
 There are also members of the non-Somali ethnic minority Bantu group (Shidle).

The region supports livestock production, rain-fed and gravity irrigated agriculture and fisheries, with an annual rainfall between 150 and 500 millimeters covering an area of approximately 60,000 square kilometers. It has a 400 km coastline on the Indian Ocean.

Demographics

The majority clan in the region is the abgaal, The second are Galje'el and Shiidle the 3rd, the region has suffered from "intense intra-clan conflict that has impoverished the region leading to a regional power struggle that divides the Abgal sub-clans. The two largest sub-clans are the Wa’buudhan (further divided into the Galmah, Kabaale and the Daud) and the Harti Abgal (further divided into the Agoonyar, Owbakar and the Warsangali). Other clans that live in the region include Reer Shabeele (Jareer weyne), Makane (Jareer Weyne) Abgal, Mubliin, Hilibi.

Districts
Middle Shabelle Region consists of Ten districts:

 Jowhar
 Gamboole
 Raaga Ceele
 Ceelow
 Balad
 Adale
 Adan Yabal
 Warseikh
 Run-Nigrod
 Mahaddey

The region supports livestock production, rain-fed and irrigated agriculture and fisheries, with an annual rainfall between 150 and 500 millimeters. Covering an area of approximately 60,000 square kilometres, the region has a 400 kilometre coastline on the Indian Ocean. The Shabelle river runs for 150 kilometres through the region.

References

External links
Administrative map of Middle Shabelle

 
Regions of Somalia